Veiga de Rengos is one of 54 parish councils in Cangas del Narcea, a municipality within the province and autonomous community of Asturias, in northern Spain. 

Its villages include: 
 Cruces
 Los Eiros
 Moncóu
 La Mourieḷḷa
 Mual
 El Pueblu
 Samartinu los Euiros
 Veiga de Rengos

References 

Parishes in Cangas del Narcea